Lycée Thibaut de Champagne is a senior high school in Provins, Seine-et-Marne, France, in the Paris metropolitan area.

References

External links

 Lycée Thibaut de Champagne 

Lycées in Seine-et-Marne